Zurea (Zureda in Spanish) is one of 24 parishes (administrative divisions) in Ḷḷena, a municipality within the province and autonomous community of Asturias, in coastal northern Spain. 

Villages 
The villages of Zureda include:

 Vaḷḷe, population 19 (year 2018)
 Zurea, population 141
 La Viña

References

External links 
 Asturian society of economic and industrial studies, English language version of "Sociedad Asturiana de Estudios Económicos e Industriales" (SADEI)

Parishes in Lena